PKB is a three-letter abbreviation that may refer to:
 Państwowy Korpus Bezpieczeństwa, WWII Polish underground police
 Patients Know Best, a tool for allowing the patient to share medical records with clinicians
 National Awakening Party (Partai Kebangkitan Bangsa), an Islamic political party in Indonesia
 Base dissociation constant pKb of a chemical compound
 Protein kinase B, an enzyme
 Mid-Ohio Valley Regional Airport in Parkersburg, West Virginia, US
 Personal knowledge base, a subjective database
 PerfKit Benchmarker of cloud performance
 PKB Corporation, a Serbian agribusiness company